The RIT Tigers represented the Rochester Institute of Technology in College Hockey America during the 2017-18 NCAA Division I women's ice hockey season.

Offseason

Recruiting

Standings

2017–18 Tigers

2017–18 Schedule

|-
!colspan=12 style=| Regular Season

|-
!colspan=12 style=| CHA Tournament

Awards and honors

References

RIT
RIT Tigers women's ice hockey seasons
Sports in Rochester, New York